Cameroon competed at the 1980 Summer Olympics in Moscow, USSR.  The nation returned to the Olympic Games after boycotting the 1976 Summer Olympics. 25 competitors, 22 men and 3 women, took part in 23 events in 5 sports.

Athletics

Men's 100 metres
Grégoire Illorson
 Heat — 10.34
 Quarterfinals — 10.29
 Semifinals — 10.60 (→ did not advance)

Men's 200 metres
 Grégoire Illorson
 Heat — 22.21 (→ did not advance)
 Emmanuel Bitanga
 Heat — did not start (→ did not advance)

Women's 100 metres
 Ruth Enang Mesode
 Heat — 12.40 (→ did not advance)

Women's Javelin Throw
 Agnes Tchuinte
 Qualification — 55.36 m (→ did not advance)

Women's Pentathlon
 Cécile Ngambi — 3832 points (→ 17th place)
 100 metres — 14.09s
 Shot Put — 10.28m 
 High Jump — 1.80m 
 Long Jump — 5.38m 
 800 metres — 2:39.70

Boxing

Men's Bantamweight (– 54 kg)
 Joseph Ahanda
 First Round — Bye
 Second Round — Defeated Tseden Narmandakh (Mongolia) after referee stopped contest in third round
 Third Round — Lost to Samson Khachatrian (Soviet Union) on points (0-5)

Men's Featherweight (– 57 kg)
 Jean Pierre Mberebe Baban
 First Round — Bye
 Second Round — Lost to Luis Pizarro (Puerto Rico) after referee stopped contest in third round

Men's Light-Welterweight (– 63,5 kg)
 Paul Kamela Fogang
 First Round — Lost to Imre Bacskai (Hungary) on points (1-4)

Cycling

Six cyclists represented Cameroon in 1980.

Individual road race
 Joseph Evouna
 Joseph Kono
 Thomas Nyemeg
 Nicolas Owona

Team time trial
 Charles Bana
 Toussaint Fouda
 Joseph Kono
 Nicolas Owona

Judo

Wrestling

References

External links
Official Olympic Reports

Nations at the 1980 Summer Olympics
1980
1980 in Cameroonian sport